Prionostemma is a large genus of harvestmen in the family Sclerosomatidae from Mexico, Central America, and South America.

Species
 Prionostemma acentrus Forster, 1954
 Prionostemma acuminatus 
 Prionostemma albimanum Roewer, 1912
 Prionostemma albipalpe (Banks, 1898)
 Prionostemma albofasciatum (F.O.Pickard-Cambridge, 1901)
 Prionostemma andinum Roewer, 1953
 Prionostemma arredoresium Roewer, 1953
 Prionostemma atrorubrum Roewer, 1912
 Prionostemma aureum Roewer, 1928
 Prionostemma aureolituratum Roewer, 1953
 Prionostemma aureomaculatum H.E.M.Soares, 1970
 Prionostemma aureopictum Roewer, 1953
 Prionostemma azulanum Roewer, 1953
 Prionostemma barnardi Forster, 1954
 Prionostemma bicolor Pocock, 1903
 Prionostemma bidens Roewer, 1953
 Prionostemma biolleyi (Banks, 1909)
 Prionostemma bogotanum Roewer, 1953
 Prionostemma boliviense Roewer, 1953
 Prionostemma bryantae Roewer, 1953
 Prionostemma ceratias Forster, 1954
 Prionostemma circulatum Roewer, 1914
 Prionostemma coloripes Roewer, 1933
 Prionostemma coriaceum (F.O.Pickard-Cambridge, 1904)
 Prionostemma coronatum (Loman, 1902)
 Prionostemma corrugatum Roewer, 1953
 Prionostemma coxale (Banks, 1909)
 Prionostemma crosbyi Roewer, 1953
 Prionostemma cubanum Roewer, 1953
 Prionostemma dentatum Roewer, 1910
 Prionostemma meridionale Ringuelet, 1959
 Prionostemma duplex Chamberlin, 1925
 Prionostemma efficiens Roewer, 1953
 Prionostemma elegans Roewer, 1953
 Prionostemma farinae Mello-Leitão, 1938
 Prionostemma ferrugineum Roewer, 1953
 Prionostemma festae Roewer, 1927
 Prionostemma fichteri C.J.Goodnight & M.L.Goodnight, 1947
 Prionostemma flavicoxale Roewer, 1953
 Prionostemma foveolatum (F.O.Pickard-Cambridge, 1904)
 Prionostemma frontale (Banks, 1909)
 Prionostemma frizzellae Roewer, 1953
 Prionostemma fulginosum Roewer, 1953
 Prionostemma fulvibrunneum Roewer, 1953
 Prionostemma fulvum (F.O.Pickard-Cambridge, 1904)
 Prionostemma fuscamaculata C.J.Goodnight & M.L.Goodnight, 1947
 Prionostemma genufuscum Roewer, 1910
 Prionostemma glieschi Mello-Leitão, 1938
 Prionostemma hadrus Forster, 1954
 Prionostemma henopoeus Forster, 1954
 Prionostemma heterus Forster, 1954
 Prionostemma hondurasium Roewer, 1953
 Prionostemma ignavus Forster, 1954
 Prionostemma insculptum Pocock, 1903
 Prionostemma insulare Roewer, 1953
 Prionostemma intermedium (Banks, 1909)
 Prionostemma laminus Forster, 1954
 Prionostemma laterale (Banks, 1909)
 Prionostemma leucostephanon Mello-Leitão, 1938
 Prionostemma limbatum Roewer, 1953
 Prionostemma limitatum Roewer, 1953
 Prionostemma lindbergi Mello-Leitão, 1938
 Prionostemma lubeca C.J.Goodnight & M.L.Goodnight, 1946
 Prionostemma luteoscutum Roewer, 1910
 Prionostemma magnificum Roewer, 1953
 Prionostemma martiniquem Roewer, 1953
 Prionostemma mediobrunneum Roewer, 1953
 Prionostemma melicum Roewer, 1953
 Prionostemma melloleitao Caporiacco, 1947
 Prionostemma mentiens Roewer, 1953
 Prionostemma minimum Roewer, 1910
 Prionostemma minutum Roewer, 1953
 Prionostemma montanum Roewer, 1953
 Prionostemma nevermanni Roewer, 1933
 Prionostemma nigranale Roewer, 1953
 Prionostemma nigrifrons Roewer, 1953
 Prionostemma nigrithorax Roewer, 1953
 Prionostemma nigrum Roewer, 1910
 Prionostemma nitens Roewer, 1953
 Prionostemma panama C.J.Goodnight & M.L.Goodnight, 1942
 Prionostemma perlucidum Roewer, 1910
 Prionostemma peruvianum Roewer, 1953
 Prionostemma piceum Roewer, 1953
 Prionostemma plaumanni Roewer, 1953
 Prionostemma pulchra C.J.Goodnight & M.L.Goodnight, 1942
 Prionostemma referens Roewer, 1953
 Prionostemma reticulatum Roewer, 1910
 Prionostemma retusum Roewer, 1953
 Prionostemma richteri Roewer, 1953
 Prionostemma riveti Roewer, 1914
 Prionostemma ruschii Mello-Leitão, 1940
 Prionostemma scintillans Pocock, 1903
 Prionostemma seriatum Roewer, 1953
 Prionostemma serrulatum Roewer, 1953
 Prionostemma simplex Chamberlin, 1925
 Prionostemma soaresi Caporiacco, 1951
 Prionostemma socialis Roewer, 1957
 Prionostemma spinituber Roewer, 1953
 Prionostemma splendens Roewer, 1953
 Prionostemma sulfureum Roewer, 1953
 Prionostemma surinamense Roewer, 1953
 Prionostemma synaptus Forster, 1954
 Prionostemma taciatum Roewer, 1953
 Prionostemma tekoma C.J.Goodnight & M.L.Goodnight, 1947
 Prionostemma transversale Roewer, 1953
 Prionostemma tristani (Banks, 1909)
 Prionostemma turki Roewer, 1953
 Prionostemma umbrosum Roewer, 1953
 Prionostemma usigillatum Mello-Leitão, 1938
 Prionostemma victoriae C.J.Goodnight & M.L.Goodnight, 1946
 Prionostemma vittatum Roewer, 1910
 Prionostemma wagneri C.J.Goodnight & M.L.Goodnight, 1944
 Prionostemma waltei Roewer, 1953
 Prionostemma yungarum Ringuelet, 1962

References

Harvestmen
Harvestman genera